Ribesalbes is a municipality located in the province of Castellón, Valencian Community, Spain.

In 1780s, Joseph Ferrer founded an earthenware factory in Ribesalbes.

References

Municipalities in the Province of Castellón
Plana Baixa